The swimming competitions at the 2017 Commonwealth Youth Games in Nassau, The Bahamas took place from 19 to 22 July at the Betty Kelly Kenning Swim Complex. A total of 184 athletes from 45 nations contested 35 different events. Each Commonwealth Games Association was allowed to enter up to two swimmers (individual events) and one relay per event. In the Games, age limits set by the Fédération Internationale de Natation (FINA) for world Junior competitions were followed, according to which the age limit for boys is set to 15–18 years (means swimmers born in 1999, 2000, 2001 and 2002) and for girls its 14–17 years of age (means swimmers born in 2000, 2001, 2002 and 2003).

Format
The competition will feature 35 long course (50m) events, divided between males, females and mixed events into the following events:
freestyle: 50, 100, 200, 400, 800 (females only) and 1500 (males only);
backstroke: 50, 100 and 200;
breaststroke: 50, 100 and 200;
butterfly: 50, 100 and 200;
individual medley (I.M.): 200 and 400;
mixed relays: 4x100 free, 4x200 free and 4x100 medley

Medal summary

Medal table

Men

During the competition Abeysinghe won the silver medal in the men's 100m freestyle event, marking Sri Lanka's first ever swimming medal at either the Youth or Senior Commonwealth Games.

Women

Mixed

Participating nations
There were 45 participating nations at the swimming competitions with a total of 184 swimmers. The number of athletes a nation entered is in parentheses beside the name of the country.

 

 
 (host nation)

References

External links
Results

2017 in swimming
2017 Commonwealth Youth Games events